West Street subway station on the Glasgow Subway network serves the Tradeston and Kingston areas of Glasgow, Scotland.

Left in an isolated industrial area by post-war reconstruction, it is the least busy station on the network with just 150,000 boardings in the 12 months to 31 March 2005 and under 100,000 by 2012.

West Street was initially one of the Glasgow Park and Ride stations. However, on 16 February 2008, the car park was closed as part of the M74 construction enabling works. The east part of the large car park for Shields Road station is closer to West Street than Shields Road, but most passengers are travelling to the city centre so choose Shields Road, the earlier stop of the two in that direction, as they would be more likely to get a seat for their journey than at West Street.

The station will become a major interchange if the Glasgow Crossrail is given the green light.

West Street is one of the stations mentioned in Cliff Hanley's song The Glasgow Underground.

Past passenger numbers 
 2004/05: 0.150 million annually
 2011/12: 0.098 million annually

References

Glasgow Subway stations
Railway stations in Great Britain opened in 1896
Gorbals